Natsagiin Bagabandi (born April 22, 1950) is a Mongolian politician and the director of Oyu Tolgoi LLC. Previously, he was the President of Mongolia from 1997 to 2005, and a member of the Mongolian People's Revolutionary Party.

Biography

He was born on 22 April 1950 in Zavkhan, Mongolia into a peasant family. In 1979 he joined the Mongolian People's Revolutionary Party. He studied in Leningrad (Leningrad Technical School of the Refrigeration Industry), Ukraine (Odessa Technological Institute of the Food Industry) and Moscow (Academy of Social Sciences at the Central Committee of the CPSU), and graduated in Food engineering. In 1987, he received a doctorate in Philosophy. He became speaker of the legislature, State Great Khural, in 1992 for four years, then ran for presidential elections in 1997, winning them. He won re-election in 2001.

In early 1997, he became General Secretary of the MPRP, shortly before the presidential elections, which were held in difficult conditions for the party. After his victory in the 1997 presidential elections, defeating his predecessor Punsalmaagiin Ochirbat, he served as president. In the presidential elections on May 22, 2005, Nambaryn Enkhbayar was elected to succeed Natsagiin Bagabandi with 53.4 percent of the vote and took office in June.

Awards 

 Order of Genghis Khan (2011)
 Order of Sukhbaatar (September 13, 2006)
 Order of Friendship (April 19, 2000)
 Grand Cross of the Hungarian Order of Merit (2005)

Personal life 
He is married with two children.

Works
"Address to UN General Assembly", 29 September 2003

References

|-

Presidents of Mongolia
Speakers of the State Great Khural
1950 births
Living people
People from Zavkhan Province
Mongolian People's Party politicians